Bayou De View is an  waterway that flows through parts of Poinsett, Woodruff, Monroe and Prairie counties in northeastern Arkansas. The bayou is part of the Cache and White River basins, ultimately flowing into the Mississippi River.

Several miles of the lower portion of Bayou de View is within the Cache River National Wildlife Refuge. In 2012, the Fish and Wildlife Service proposed an expansion of the refuge, purchasing land as available from willing sellers, to include an additional  of Bayou De View in the refuge.

The land area bordering the bayou supports dense vegetation in the form of tupelo, bald cypress, hickory, pine and other native trees of the hardwood and softwood families. This area used to be known as part of the "Big Woods" of Arkansas, but most of the standing timber was cleared for farming by the second half of the 20th century. Now, however, there are many reforestation projects underway around the edges of the bayou, including moist-soils projects and hardwood planting projects.

Recently, Bayou De View and the town of Brinkley have gained international attention from possible sightings of the ivory-billed woodpecker, which was thought to be extinct since the 1940s.

See also
List of rivers of Arkansas

References

Bodies of water of Woodruff County, Arkansas
Bodies of water of Monroe County, Arkansas
Bodies of water of Prairie County, Arkansas
Rivers of Arkansas
Tributaries of the White River (Arkansas–Missouri)